The Mysuru Chennai Express is a train in India, linking Mysuru Junction and Chennai Central.

Timings

It leaves Mysuru Junction at 0500 hrs and reaches Puratchi Thalaivar Dr. M.G. Ramachandran Central Railway Station at around 14:30 hrs. In the return direction, it leaves Puratchi Thalaivar Dr. M.G. Ramachandran Central Railway Station at 13:35 hrs and reaches Mysuru Junction at 2245 hrs. The train number is 12609 in the Chennai to Mysuru direction and 12610 in the Mysuru to Chennai direction. The train has around 24 coaches. It is categorized as a "Superfast Express".

The composition of this train is:
AC chair car: 2
Second class (reserved): 7
Pantry: 1
Unreserved: 12
Luggage vans: 2

Loco link 
It runs on a complete electrified railway route and is regularly hauled by WAP7 of either Lallaguda , Royapuram or Krishnarajapuram Shed.

Introduction & destinations 
Mysuru - Chennai Express was introduced as Bengaluru - Chennai Express by the Southern Railway. It traverses the 362 km distance in 6 hours 30 min. The rake is now maintained by South Western Railway at Bangalore.

Stoppages
This train stops at Tiruvallur, Arakkonam Junction, Sholinghur, Walajah Road, Mukundarayapuram, Katpadi Junction, Gudiyattam, Ambur, Vaniyambadi, Jolarpet Junction, Kuppam, Bangarpet, Malur, Whitefield, Krishnarajapuram,
Bangalore East, Bangalore Cantonment, Kengeri, Ramanagaram, Channapatna, Madur, Mandya & Pandavapura . The train stops at Perambur towards Chennai direction.

See also
 Bhopal Bharat Teerth Express
 Brindavan Express
 Lal Bagh Express
 Yelagiri express

References

External links
Bangalore-Chennai Express Route Map India Rail Info

Transport in Chennai
Transport in Bangalore
Express trains in India
Rail transport in Karnataka
Rail transport in Tamil Nadu